Wanzi (Wandji) is a Bantu language spoken in Gabon.

References

Nzebi languages